Gasa is a town near Gasa Dzong in Gasa District in northwestern Bhutan.

At the 2005 census, its population was 3,116.

References

External links 
Satellite map at Maplandia.com

Populated places in Bhutan